is a sub-kilometer near-Earth object and potentially hazardous asteroid of the Apollo class, discovered by Pan-STARRS on 8 August 2019, two weeks after it passed Earth at 62 LD. With an observation arc of 103 days, Earth approach dates become divergent by 2042 as the date of closest approach in 2042 has an uncertainty of ±3 days.

Orbit and classification 

 belongs to the Apollo asteroids, which cross the orbit of Earth. Apollos are the largest group of near-Earth objects with about 10 thousand known members. It orbits the Sun at a distance of 0.999–3.92 AU once every 3 years and 10 months (1,407 days; semi-major axis of 2.46 AU). Its orbit has an eccentricity of 0.59 and an inclination of 20° with respect to the ecliptic. With an uncertainty parameter of 4 and 5, respectively, long term predictions of the object's trajectory are imprecise.

 is also a potentially hazardous asteroid (PHA) because its minimum orbit intersection distance (MOID) is less than 0.05 AU and its diameter is greater than 150 meters.

Close approaches 
In June 2065 it should pass within . In July 2111 a possibly notable close-approach to Earth may occur, but the asteroid is expected to pass  from Earth and has an uncertainty region of about ±15 million km. The asteroid is not listed on the Sentry Risk Table as the nonlinearities along the line of variations do not intersect where Earth will be.

Diameter and albedo 
Based on its brightness and the way it reflects light, the object's diameter may vary as much as 200–450 meters, depending on whether its surface is of a stony or a carbonaceous composition, which correspond to an albedo of 0.25 and 0.05, respectively.

It has been estimated that asteroids of similar size such as 99942 Apophis could produce up to 10 million casualties if they hit populated areas.

Notes

References

External links 
 List Of Apollo Minor Planets (by designation), Minor Planet Center
 
 
 

Minor planet object articles (unnumbered)

Near-Earth objects in 2019
20190808